Arts University Plymouth is an independent university-sector Higher Education (HE) provider located in Plymouth in South West England. The former Plymouth College of Art was officially granted university status in 2022. In April 2019 the specialist college was awarded taught degree awarding powers (TDAP) by the Quality Assurance Agency for Higher Education (QAA), granting the institution the authority to award and accredit its own BA (Hons) degrees and Masters awards.

Description 
The University provides creative education at undergraduate, postgraduate and pre-degree level, specialising in the fields of art, design, crafts and media. Pre-Degree courses include  Foundation Diploma in Art and Design.

The Gallery, Plymouth Arts Cinema and Fab Lab Plymouth are located in the city centre campus, offering a range of short courses, masterclasses, and National Art & Design Young Arts Club. The college is a UK Advisory Council Member of the Creative Industries Federation, a Member of the Crafts Council Advisory Group, a founding associate of Tate’s Tate Exchange programme and a Steering Group Member of the Cultural Learning Alliance.

Student body 
The University caters for approximately 2,000 students, with around 85% of full-time students on Higher Education courses in 2017. Over 400 members of staff are employed by the college. Students are enrolled from the local area, the wider south-west region, and further afield in the United Kingdom. The college also attracts international students, with Erasmus+ partnership institutions across Europe including Design Academy Eindhoven and National Academy of Art, Sofia.

Administration 
The University is administered by a corporation.

History 
Founded as the Plymouth Drawing School in 1856, Arts University Plymouth is one of the last specialist art schools in the United Kingdom.

The College has delivered higher education (HE) provision for over 20 years, initially as part of an indirect funding partnership with the University of Plymouth to develop foundation degrees. In 2006, the Higher Education Funding Council for England (HEFCE) awarded directly funded student numbers to Plymouth College of Art, and the College transferred its validation arrangements to the Open University (OU).

In December 2008, Plymouth College of Art and Design was renamed to Plymouth College of Art.

In 2013, the college founded the city-centre free school for 4 to 16-year-olds Plymouth School of Creative Arts. Together the school and college have established a radical and progressive continuum of creative learning and practice in the region that extends from early years to Masters level study. The school's landmark building The Red House was formally opened by Tate Director Sir Nicholas Serota who hailed the opening as "a historic event in the history of education in this country".

In 2019, Plymouth College of Art received Taught Degree Awarding Powers (TDAP), granting them, as an independent Higher Education Institution, the power to award their own degrees. In Autumn 2020, the first cohort of undergraduate and postgraduate students graduated from Plymouth College of Art with an award accredited by the institution.

In May 2022, the College was awarded University status

Honorary Degrees
In 2009, the college awarded two honorary degrees which were conferred by The Open University. Artist Anthony Frost was awarded an honorary Master of The Open University and Raindance founder Elliot Grove was awarded an honorary Doctor of The Open University for their services to art and education and culture, respectively.

Honorary fellowships have since been offered to artist David McKee, Toby Gorniak MBE, Peter Jenkinson OBE, Sir John Sorrell CBE and Lady Frances Sorrell OBE, and Sir Nicholas Serota and Richard Deacon CBE, among others.  

In 2018 Honorary Fellowships were awarded to Mike Westbrook OBE, musician, to Clare Twomey, a leading British ceramics and performance artist, as well as photographer Suki Dhanda and former Director of Plymouth Arts Centre Bernard Samuels.

Students' Union
Arts University Plymouth Students' Union, usually abbreviated "AUP:SU" is based at the Tavistock Place campus. It was established in 1998. Each year, students elect a paid Student Union President who will represent them for the following year, along with a team of voluntary Student Union Executive Committee positions. The Union offers a range of services (such as the Student Union Food Bank) and a number of events throughout the year, including Freshers.

The current Student Union President is Fraizer James, elected for 2022/23 after being a Student Ambassador for the University.

In 2021, Arts University Plymouth Students’ Union (AUP:SU) won Best Campaign Supporting Student Wellbeing at the 2021 Think Student Awards, beating leading international universities to be selected as the winner by the Student Pulse panel of 40,000 students.

See also
 Armorial of UK universities
 List of art universities and colleges in Europe
 List of universities in the UK
 Plymouth Marjon University
 University of Plymouth
 Visual arts education

Notable alumni

 Harry Borden, photographer
 Charles Dance, British actor
 Candice Farmer, photographer
 Catriona Fraser, photographer, curator, and art dealer
 Josephine Harris, glass engraver and painter
 Raymond Hawkey, British designer and author
 Keith Rowe, British musician and painter (AMM)
 David Mckee, British author
 Suki Dhanda, photographer
 Malcolm Le Grice, Artist and filmmaker

References

External links
 Arts University Plymouth
 University of Plymouth Partner Colleges
 The Open University

Education in Plymouth, Devon
Art schools in England
Further education colleges in Devon
Educational institutions established in 1856
1856 establishments in England
Buildings and structures in Plymouth, Devon
Arts organizations established in the 1850s
Universities in Devon
Universities UK